The  doubles Tournament at the 2005 Gaz de France Stars took place in late October, 2005, on indoor hard courts in Hasselt, Belgium.

Jennifer Russell and Mara Santangelo were the defending champions, but competed with different partners. Russell paired up with Eleni Daniilidou, but lost in the quarterfinals; Santangelo partnered with Roberta Vinci, also losing in the quarterfinals.

Émilie Loit and Katarina Srebotnik emerged as the winners.

Seeds

 N/A (team withdrew)
  Émilie Loit /  Katarina Srebotnik (winners)
  Eleni Daniilidou /  Jennifer Russell (quarterfinals)
  Maria Elena Camerin /  Nuria Llagostera Vives (semifinals)
  Mara Santangelo /  Roberta Vinci (quarterfinals)

Results

Draw

References

2005 Doubles
Gaz de France Stars - Doubles
2005 in Belgian tennis
Sport in Hasselt